Rhagodia is a genus in the arachnid order Solifugae, comprising five species found in Syria, Israel, Sudan and Eritrea.

References 

Solifugae genera
Fauna of Ethiopia